The 2020–21 Arkansas–Pine Bluff Golden Lions men's basketball team represented the University of Arkansas at Pine Bluff in the 2020–21 NCAA Division I men's basketball season. The Golden Lions, led by 13th-year head coach George Ivory, played their home games at the K. L. Johnson Complex in Pine Bluff, Arkansas as members of the Southwestern Athletic Conference.

Previous season
The Golden Lions finished the 2019–20 season 4–26, 3–15 in SWAC play to finish in a tie for ninth place. They failed to qualify for the SWAC tournament.

Roster

Schedule and results 

|-
!colspan=12 style=| Non-conference regular season

|-
!colspan=12 style=| SWAC regular season

|-
!colspan=9 style=| SWAC tournament

Sources

References

Arkansas–Pine Bluff Golden Lions men's basketball seasons
Arkansas–Pine Bluff Golden Lions
Arkansas–Pine Bluff Golden Lions men's basketball
Arkansas–Pine Bluff Golden Lions men's basketball